Oliver Perry Monument is a bronze statue, by William Greene Turner, dedicated to Commodore Oliver Hazard Perry.  It is located in Eisenhower Park in Newport, RI,  between Washington Square and Touro street. The statue faces west towards Newport Harbor.

The inscription reads:

The statue was dedicated 10 September 1885, the 72nd anniversary of the Battle of Lake Erie.  The monument is described as

References

External links
https://www.flickr.com/photos/wallyg/1201612767/

Monuments and memorials in Rhode Island
Bronze sculptures in Rhode Island
1885 sculptures
Statues in Rhode Island
1885 establishments in Rhode Island
Sculptures of men in Rhode Island
Outdoor sculptures in Rhode Island